Vaso is a village located in Kheda district of Gujarat, India. The zip code is 387380.

Places of interest 
Vithalbhai Haveli is a of late 18th century haveli with beautifully carved wooden pillars, frames, beams, ceilings and doors.

References

Villages in Kheda district